Isononyl alcohol (INA) is a nine carbon primary alcohol. INA, along with 3,5,5-trimethyl-1-hexanol, makes up the mixture commonly referred to as isononanol. It is used in small amounts as fragrance in soap, hair spray, face creams, and shampoo.

References 

Nonanols